

Midgee is a locality in the Australian state of South Australia located on the east coast of Eyre Peninsula about  north-west of the state capital of Adelaide and about  north of the municipal seat of Cowell.

Its boundaries were created in 1998 in respect to the “long established local name.”

Land use in Midgee is divided between primary industry and conservation with the former being represented by “broadacre farming of cereals and livestock” and the latter being represented by the Munyaroo Conservation Park and the zoning of land adjoining the coastline with Spencer Gulf.

Midgee is located within the federal division of Grey, the state electoral district of Flinders and the local government area of the District Council of Franklin Harbour.

See also
Midgee (disambiguation)

References

Towns in South Australia
Eyre Peninsula
Spencer Gulf